Kuntzig (Lorraine Franconian: Kënzech/Kënzeg) is a commune in the Moselle department in Grand Est in north-eastern France. In 1988 it ceded part of its territory to the new commune of Stuckange.

Population

See also
 Communes of the Moselle department

References

External links
 

Communes of Moselle (department)